The following outline is provided as an overview of and topical guide to London:

London – capital and most populous city of England, Great Britain, and the United Kingdom. On the River Thames in the south east of the island of Great Britain, London has been a major settlement for two millennia. It was founded by the Romans, who named it Londinium. London is a cultural capital and leading global city in the arts, commerce, education, entertainment, fashion, finance, healthcare, media, professional services, research and development, tourism, and transport. It is the world's financial capital and has the fifth-or sixth-largest metropolitan area GDP in the world.

General reference 

 Panorama of London
 Pronunciation: 
 Etymology of London
 Adjectival(s): London
 Demonym(s): Londoner

Geography of London 

Geography of London
 Panorama of London

Location of London 

 London is situated in the following regions:
 Northern Hemisphere, Western Hemisphere & Eastern Hemisphere (on the Prime meridian)
 Atlantic Ocean
 Eurasia
 Europe
 Northern Europe
 Western Europe
 British Isles
 United Kingdom
 Great Britain
 England
 London commuter belt
 Greater London Built-up Area
 Greater London

 Time zone:  Western European Time (UTC±00:00), Coordinated Universal Time (UTC±00:00), Greenwich Mean Time

Environment of London 

 Climate of London
 Geology of London

Geographical features of London 

 Thames Barrier

Landforms of London 

 River Thames
 Subterranean rivers of London

Areas of London 
 Central London
 East London
 Inner London
 London postal district
 Metropolitan Green Belt
 North London
 Outer London
 South London
 Outer London
 Subterranean London
 West London

Locations in London

Historic sites 

 Barbican Estate
 Catacombs of London
 Covent Garden
 Leicester Square
 Mayfair
 Piccadilly Circus
 St Paul's Cathedral
 Tower Bridge
 Trafalgar Square
 World Heritage Sites
 Tower of London
 Kew Gardens
 Maritime Greenwich
 Royal Observatory, Greenwich
 Westminster site
 Palace of Westminster
 Westminster Abbey
 Saint Margaret's Church

British Royal Family 
British Royal Family

 Buckingham Palace
 Clarence House
 Hampton Court Palace
 Horse Guards Parade
 Kensington Palace
 The Mall, London
 St James's Palace

Modern attractions 
 8 Canada Square
 30 St Mary Axe
 Canary Wharf
 Citigroup Centre, London
 London Eye
 Millennium Bridge, London
 The O2 Arena
 Millennium Dome
 One Canada Square
 The Pinnacle (London)
 The Shard
 Tower 42
 Wembley Stadium

Museums and galleries in London 
Museumsand galleries
 British Museum
 Imperial War Museum
 Museum of London
 National Gallery
 National Maritime Museum
 National Portrait Gallery, London
 Natural History Museum, London
 Science Museum, London
 Tate Britain
 Tate Modern
 Victoria and Albert Museum

Parks and open spaces 
 Royal Parks of London
 Battersea Park
 Clapham Common
 Green Park
 Greenwich Park
 Hyde Park, London
 Kensington Gardens
 Regent's Park
 St. James's Park

Monuments 
 Albert Memorial
 Cenotaph
 Cleopatra's Needle
 Monument to the Great Fire of London
 Nelson's Column
 more ...

Retail locations 
 Bond Street
 Carnaby Street
 Harrods
 Harvey Nichols
 Knightsbridge
 Liberty (department store)
 Oxford Street
 Regent Street
 Selfridges
 Tottenham Court Road

Civic buildings 
 Bow Street Magistrates' Court
 City Hall (London)
 City of London Police
 London Ambulance Service
 London Fire Brigade
 Mayor of London
 Metropolitan Police Service
 Scotland Yard
 Old Bailey
 Royal Courts of Justice

Demographics of London 

 Demography of London

Politics of London

London government 

London government
 History of local government in London
 Mayor of London
 Greater London Authority
 London Assembly
 City of London Corporation
 Ken Livingstone
 London Development Agency
 City Hall, London (Newham)
 London Plan
 Metropolitan Board of Works
 Greater London Council
 London County Council

Subdivisions
 City of London
 London boroughs
List of London boroughs
 London Borough of Barking and Dagenham
 London Borough of Barnet
 London Borough of Bexley
 London Borough of Brent
 London Borough of Bromley
 London Borough of Camden
 London Borough of Croydon
 London Borough of Ealing
 London Borough of Enfield
 Royal Borough of Greenwich
 London Borough of Hackney
 London Borough of Hammersmith and Fulham
 London Borough of Haringey
 London Borough of Harrow
 London Borough of Havering
 London Borough of Hillingdon
 London Borough of Hounslow
 London Borough of Islington
 Royal Borough of Kensington and Chelsea
 Royal Borough of Kingston upon Thames
 London Borough of Lambeth
 London Borough of Lewisham
 London Borough of Merton
 London Borough of Newham
 London Borough of Redbridge
 London Borough of Richmond upon Thames
 London Borough of Southwark
 London Borough of Sutton
 London Borough of Tower Hamlets
 London Borough of Waltham Forest
 London Borough of Wandsworth
 City of Westminster

Historical subdivisions
Created through London Government Act 1899 in 1900, these subdivisions were abolished through London Government Act 1963 in 1965.
County of London - corresponds to present day Inner London
Metropolitan boroughs of the County of London
 Metropolitan Borough of Battersea
 Metropolitan Borough of Bermondsey
 Metropolitan Borough of Bethnal Green
 Metropolitan Borough of Camberwell
 Metropolitan Borough of Chelsea
 Metropolitan Borough of Deptford
 Metropolitan Borough of Finsbury
 Metropolitan Borough of Fulham
 Metropolitan Borough of Greenwich
 Metropolitan Borough of Hackney
 Metropolitan Borough of Hammersmith
 Metropolitan Borough of Hampstead
 Metropolitan Borough of Holborn
 Metropolitan Borough of Islington
 Metropolitan Borough of Kensington
 Metropolitan Borough of Lambeth
 Metropolitan Borough of Lewisham
 Metropolitan Borough of Paddington
 Metropolitan Borough of Poplar
 Metropolitan Borough of Shoreditch
 Metropolitan Borough of Southwark
 Metropolitan Borough of St Marylebone
 Metropolitan Borough of St Pancras
 Metropolitan Borough of Stepney
 Metropolitan Borough of Stoke Newington
 Metropolitan Borough of Wandsworth
 Metropolitan Borough of Westminster
 Metropolitan Borough of Woolwich
List of civil parishes in the County of London in 1891

Law enforcement in London 
 Crime in London
 Law enforcement agencies in London
 Metropolitan Police Service ("The MET")
 Scotland Yard (MET headquarters)
 Commissioner of Police of the Metropolis
 Deputy Commissioner of Police of the Metropolis
 Operation Sassoon

UK government in London 
 Downing Street
 Thames House
 SIS (MI6)
 Middlesex Guildhall
 Palace of Westminster
 Palace of Whitehall
 Portcullis House
 Somerset House
 War Office
 Whitehall

History of London 

History of London

History of London, by important milestones 

 City of London
 Lundenwic
 Peasants' Revolt
 Black Death
 Great Plague of London
 Livery Company
 Great Fire of London
 Industrial Revolution
 British Empire
 Great Stink
 The Great Exhibition
 Cool Britannia

History of London, by period 

History of London   (timeline)
 Londinium (Roman London)
 Anglo-Saxon London
 Norman and Medieval London
 London uprising
 Tudor London
 Stuart London
 Great Plague of London
 Great Fire of London
 18th-century London
 19th-century London
 20th-century London 
 History of London (1900–1939)
 London during World War II
 The Blitz
 Second Great Fire of London
 Modern London (from 1945)
 Swinging London (London in the 1960s)

History of London, by region

History of London, by subject 

 Disasters
 Fires
 Early fires of London
 Great Fire of London
 Second Great Fire of London
 Disease
 Great Plague of London
 COVID-19 pandemic in London
 Attacks
 London uprising
 Siege of London (1471)
 The Blitz
 List of terrorist incidents in London
 7 July 2005 London bombings
 History of local government in London
 History of London Transport

Culture of London 

Culture of London
 Architecture of London
 Hotels in London
 Events in London
 Annual events in London
 LGBT culture in London
 Tourism in London
 Hotels in London
 Venues in London

Art in London 

 Panorama of London

Cinema of London

Music of London 
 Camerata of London
 London Jazz Festival
 London Philharmonic Orchestra
 London Symphony Orchestra
 Royal Opera House
 Royal Philharmonic Orchestra

Theatre in London 
 West End theatre
 List of London venues

Language in London 
 London slang

People of London 

 List of people from London
 Ethnic groups in London
 Chinese community in London

Religion in London 

Religion in London
 List of cemeteries in London
 Christianity in London
 Islam in London

Sport in London 
Sport in London
Football in London

Sports clubs in London

Cricket
 Marylebone Cricket Club
 Middlesex County Cricket Club
 Surrey County Cricket Club
 Rugby union
 Harlequin F.C.
 London Wasps
 London Welsh RFC
 Saracens F.C.
 Rugby league
 London Broncos

Sports events in London

 Olympics
 1908 Summer Olympics
 1948 Summer Olympics
 2012 Summer Olympics
 London Marathon
 The Championships, Wimbledon
 London Grand Prix

Sports venues in London 

 All England Lawn Tennis and Croquet Club
 Boleyn Ground
 Craven Cottage
 Crystal Palace National Sports Centre
 Emirates Stadium
 ExCeL London
 Herne Hill Velodrome
 Lord's Cricket Ground
 Olympic Stadium (London)
 Stamford Bridge (stadium)
 The Oval
 The Valley (London)
 Twickenham Stadium
 Wembley Stadium
 White Hart Lane

Economy and infrastructure of London 

Economy of London
 Agriculture in London
 Banking in London
 List of banks in the United Kingdom
 Bank of England
 Hotels in London
 Media in London
 London Internet Exchange
 London Stock Exchange
 Tourism in London
 Hotels in London
 Water supply and sanitation in London
 Waste disposal authorities in London
 City of London
 City of London Corporation
 Institute of Economic Affairs
 Livery Company
 London Docklands

Transportation in London 

Transport in London
 Transport administration
 Port of London Authority
 Transport for London
 London Buses
 London Rail
 London Streets
 Air transport in London
 Airports of London
 Cycling in London
 Public transport in London
 Bus transport in London
 Buses in London
 AEC Routemaster
 New Routemaster
 Articulated buses in London
 more...
 Rail transport in London
 London Underground
 Docklands Light Railway
 Tramlink
 Ship transport in London
 Port of London

Education in London 

Education in London

 List of universities and higher education colleges in London
 Guildhall School of Music and Drama
 Imperial College London
 Institute of Education
 King's College London
 London School of Economics
 Middlesex University
 Queen Mary, University of London
 Royal Academy of Music
 Royal College of Music
 Royal Institution
 SOAS, University of London
 Trinity Laban Conservatoire of Music and Dance
 University College London
 University of Greenwich
 University of London

See also 

 020
 Home counties

References

External links 

 London.gov.uk – Greater London Authority
 VisitLondon.com – Official London tourism site
 Transport for London (TfL) – city transport authority
 Museum of London
 British Pathé – Digitalised archive containing hundreds of films of 20th century London
 London in British History Online, with links to numerous authoritative online sources
 Map of Early Modern London – Historical map and encyclopaedia of Shakespeare's London

London
London